Although there were over 180 monarchs who ruled the Sinhalese Monarchy, there have only been 4 Sinhalese female monarchs. Two ruled during the Anuradhapura Period, another two during the Polonnaruwa Period.

Anuradhapura Kingdom
 Anula of Anuradhapura (47 BC – 42 BC) :
Anula was the first known Queen regnant found both within Sri Lankan history and during Anuradhapura period. She is also considered as the first female head of state in Asia. Being come to known first as the consort of King Chora Naga, son of King Valagambahu of Anuradhapura, she is infamous for killing at least 6 of her husbands or consorts by poisoning them. The second husband of her, Kuda Tissa, was actually the son of the brother of Chora Naga and rose to the throne as his legal successor. But her other husbands who rose to the throne as the King of Sri Lanka were not his legal successors and were only the husbands of then present legal successor, Anula. They are (in chronological order) Siva I, Vatuka, Darubhatika Tissa and Niliya, who ruled the country within just one year. After the death of her final husband Niliya, she became the sole ruler of the country for about 5 years thus becoming the first known female monarch of Sri Lanka, but was the real power behind the King during the tenures of all of her husbands, also. At the end of her tenure, she was deposed by Mahakuli Mahatissa's second son, Kutakanna Tissa. The Mahavamsa states that Kutakanna Tissa had Anula burned on a funeral pyre. Other sources indicate that Anula was burned alive in the palace where she had committed her murders. She was from the House of Vijaya.
 Sivali of Anuradhapura (35 AD)
Sivali was the second known female monarch within Sri Lankan history and succeeded her brother Chulabhaya. She only ruled the country for about 4 months within the year 35 AD and was succeeded by her nephew Ilanaga, presumably the son of her brother Chulabhaya, after an interregnum of 3 years. She was also from the House of Vijaya.

Polonnaruwa Kingdom

 Lilavati of Polonnaruwa (1197–1200, 1209–1210, 1211–1212)
 Kalyanavati of Polonnaruwa (1202 – 1208)

Others
 Dona Catherina of Kandy
 Sugala of Ruhuna

See also
 List of Sinhalese monarchs

References

External links
 Lakdiva, List of sovereigns of Lanka
 Vijaya and the Lankan Monarchs
 Complete list of Sri Lankan Leaders
 The Mahavamsa History of Sri Lanka

Sri Lanka

Lists of women by occupation